EMT may refer to:

Arts and entertainment
 E.M.T. (music group)

Health and medicine 
 Emergency medical technician
 Epithelial–mesenchymal transition (or transformation)
 Extraneuronal monoamine transporter

Science and technology
 Ecological modernization theory
 Electrical metallic tubing
 Error management theory
 Extended mind thesis

Transportation
 East Midlands Trains, a former UK operator
 Empresa Municipal de Transportes de Madrid (EMT Madrid), public transport, Madrid, Spain
 San Gabriel Valley Airport, formerly El Monte Airport, a public airport 1 mile (1.6 km) north of El Monte, California; IATA airport code EMT

People
Steve Emt (Stephen Emt) (born 1970), American wheelchair curler, 2018 Winter Paralympian

Other uses
 Elektro-Mess-Technik (EMT), a German audio equipment manufacturer
 EMT (mobile operator), an Estonian mobile operator
 Epic Mickey 2: The Power of Two, a 2012 video game and the sequel to Disney's Epic Mickey
 European Master's in Translation
Interac e-Transfer, formerly Interac Email Money Transfer or EMT, a funds transfer service in Canada